The first season of the American animated television series The Grim Adventures of Billy & Mandy originally aired on Cartoon Network in the United States from August 24, 2001, to October 22, 2004. It consisted of 18 episodes, including the 49 Grim & Evil episodes, one exclusive episode, and the half-hour Halloween special (also made originally for Grim & Evil), in which Billy, Mandy, and Grim face against Jack O'Lantern. The 2003 episodes were also produced originally for Grim & Evil, but were only aired as part of the series, due to Cartoon Network and Maxwell Atoms having a decision to split Grim & Evil into two separate shows in 2003.

This season introduces the three title characters, boy-wizard Nigel Planter and supporting characters such as Dean Toadblatt, which constitutes a parody of the Harry Potter franchise. Other characters that make major appearances include Mandy's nemesis, the popular and snobby Mindy; Nergal Junior, the son of Nergal, and Billy's aunt Sis; and Jeff the Spider, who is hatched from an egg by Billy.

Other characters that were also introduced are Hoss Delgado, who battles zombie brownies alongside Billy; and Eris, who keeps scheming to create chaos with the Apple of Discord.

The only exclusive original episode of this season, and to not be made for Grim & Evil, is "Five O' Clock Shadows", which aired alongside Evil Con Carne's "Ultimate Evil" on October 22, 2004, and later aired in reruns alongside "Terror of the Black Knight", which became its sister episode since its second airing.

Episodes

DVD releases 
The Grim Adventures of Billy & Mandy: Season 1 was released on Region 1 DVD on September 18, 2007. It contains the episodes "Meet the Reaper" – "Love is 'Evol' Spelled Backwards" and "Battle of the Bands". Along with bonus features, it also includes the Evil Con Carne episodes "Evil Con Carne", "Emotional Skarr", "Evil Goes Wild", "Evil on Trial", and "The Smell of Vengeance".

Other releases including The Grim Adventures of Billy & Mandy season one episodes:
 "Billy and Mandy's Jacked-Up Halloween" – Cartoon Network Halloween: 9 Creepy Cartoon Capers (August 10, 2004)
 "Son of Nergal" – Cartoon Network Christmas: Yuletide Follies (October 5, 2004)
 "Night of the Living Grim" – Cartoon Network Halloween 2: Grossest Halloween Ever (August 9, 2005)
 "Crushed!" – Codename: Kids Next Door: Sooper Hugest Missions: File Two (August 23, 2005)
 "Battle of the Bands" – Cartoon Network: Christmas Rocks (October 4, 2005)
 The first thirteen episodes and "Battle of the Bands" – 4 Kid Favorites: The Hall of Fame Collection Vol. 3 (June 23, 2015)

References 

The Grim Adventures of Billy & Mandy seasons
2001 American television seasons
2002 American television seasons
2003 American television seasons
2004 American television seasons